Needmore is an unincorporated community in Marshall Township, Lawrence County, Indiana.

History
Tradition has it that Needmore was so named because early settlers there were always in need of food.

Geography

References

Unincorporated communities in Lawrence County, Indiana
Unincorporated communities in Indiana